Zambezia may refer to:
 Zambezia Province, Mozambique
 Zambezia, Cabo Delgado, Mozambique
 Zambezia (film), a 2012 South African computer-animated film
 Zambezia (journal): The Journal of Humanities of the University of Zimbabwe
 Zambezia or Zambesia, an early name for Rhodesia (now Zambia and Zimbabwe)